The 2022 Rugby World Cup Sevens Women's European Qualifier was the final qualification event for the 2022 Rugby World Cup Sevens. 4 teams qualified from the 12 teams entered. The event was held at the Stadionul Arcul de Triumf in Bucharest.

Teams

 
 
  (Q)
 
  (Q)
 
  (Q)
 
 
  (Q)
 
 

Teams marked with (Q) qualified for 2022 Rugby World Cup Sevens.

Event
All times are in Eastern European Summer Time.

Pool stage

Pool A

Pool B

Pool C

Qualification play-offs
Winners of the 4 matches advance to 2022 Rugby World Cup Sevens.

References

 
2022
2022 rugby sevens competitions
International rugby union competitions hosted by Romania
Sports competitions in Bucharest
2022 in Romanian sport
Rugby World Cup Sevens